Afternoon Live is a programme broadcast on the BBC News Channel between 2:00pm and 5:00 pm. It first aired on 2 October 2017. Due to reduced output by BBC News as a result of the COVID-19 pandemic, the programme is currently off air.

Presenters
The programme's main presenter between 2017 and March 2021 was Simon McCoy, who tended to present the programme Monday to Thursday.

Former presenters
 Carole Walker (2018-2019)
 Nicholas Owen (2019)
 Carrie Gracie (2019)
 Simon McCoy (2017-2021)

See also
 List of BBC newsreaders and reporters

References

External links

2020s British television series
BBC television news shows
British television news shows